Cafer Sadık Kutlay  (1912 – 26 July 1988) was a Turkish, business man, civil engineer, politician and former government minister.

Cafer Sadık was born in Anamur ilçe (district) of Mersin Province in 1912. He graduated from Istanbul Technical University and served in the State Hydraulic Works (DSİ) of Turkey. Between 1945 and 1951, he was the regional director of DSİ in Samsun. Then, he established his own company to work as a constructor and consultant. He joined the Republican People's Party (CHP), and in the 1961 general election, he won a seat as a deputy from Mersin Province in the 12th Parliament of Turkey. On 15 December 1964, he was appointed Minister of Construction and Settlement in the 28th government of Turkey. However, his term ended when the government was overturned by a motion of no confidence on 20 February 1965. He kept his seat in the parliament in the 13th Parliament of Turkey until 1969 general election.

Kutlay was married, and father of three. He died on 26 July 1988.

References

1912 births
People from Anamur
Istanbul Technical University alumni
Turkish civil engineers
Republican People's Party (Turkey) politicians
Deputies of Mersin
Members of the 12th Parliament of Turkey
Members of the 13th Parliament of Turkey
Members of the 28th government of Turkey
Government ministers of Turkey
1988 deaths